Yeşilköy (meaning "Green Village"; prior to 1926, San Stefano or Santo Stefano) is an affluent neighbourhood in the district of Bakırköy, Istanbul, Turkey, on the Marmara Sea about  west of Istanbul's historic city centre. Prior to the rapid increase of Istanbul's population in the 1970s, Yeşilköy was a secluded village and sea resort.

Etymology
The original name, San Stefano, in use until 1926, derives from a legend: in the early 13th century, the ship carrying Saint Stephen's relics to Rome from Constantinople, sacked by the crusaders of the Fourth Crusade, was forced to stop here because of a storm. The relics were taken to a church until the sea calmed, and this gave the name to the church and to the place. In 1926, the village was named Yeşilköy which means "Green Village" in Turkish. It is believed that the writer Halit Ziya Uşakligil who lived there at the time gave this new name to the village. It is still referred to as Сан Стефано in Bulgarian (bg).

History

In 1203, the beach of Agios Stefanos was the site of disembarkation of the Latin army of the Fourth Crusade, which would conquer Constantinople the following year.

In the 19th century, the whole village was owned by the powerful Armenian Dadian family.

During the Crimean War, French forces were stationed here and built one of the three historic lighthouses of Istanbul still in use. San Stefano  was where in 1878 the Russian forces halted their advance towards Constantinople at the end of the Russo-Turkish War and was the location where the Treaty of San Stefano was signed between the Russian and Ottoman Empires. In 1909, the decision to send Sultan Abdülhamid II into exile to Thessaloniki was taken by the members of the Committee of Union and Progress at the yacht club of San Stefano.

On 10 July 1894, San Stefano – as with the whole Marmara region of Constantinople – was hit by a strong earthquake, followed by a tsunami. The sea receded 100 metres from the shore and the following tsunami created giant waves which devastated the coast. The boathouse, the docks and large wooden structures were damaged, many houses were destroyed or damaged and also the train track was severely damaged by the quake.

San Stefano was where the first aviation facilities were built in the Ottoman Empire in 1912 and an aviation school was set up and later developed by German officers to train pilots for the Ottoman Aviation Squadrons.

In 1912, during the Balkan Wars, thousands of soldiers suffering from cholera were brought here, and about 3,000 of them died and were buried near the train station.

Shortly after the Ottomans' entry into the First World War as Germany's ally, on 14 November 1914, a monument erected here in 1898 to commemorate the Russian soldiers who died in 1878, was blown up by the Ottoman military as a propaganda event; the demolition is thought to have been filmed by the first Turkish filmmaker Fuat Uzkınay and thus is officially deemed to be the birth of Turkish cinema.

Demographics
Beginning in the late 1800s, San Stefano was a favourite coastal resort and hunting place for Constantinople's upper classes. Until the beginning of the 20th century, the village had a predominantly Christian population. Beginning in the late 1800s, San Stefano was a favourite coastal resort and hunting place for Constantinople's upper classes. It had a mixed population, composed of Turks, Greeks (now almost completely gone), Armenians and Levantines (Italian and French people, now mostly gone). The legacy of its once cosmopolitan character is present: an Italian mission, an Italian Catholic church and cemetery, an Armenian Apostolic Church and a few Greek churches still exist in the area, with the Armenians and Italians of the district still frequenting their churches. The Kurds and the Assyrians, faithful of the Syriac Orthodox Church, who have emigrated to Istanbul since the second half of the 20th century from eastern and southeastern Turkey, are relatively more recent newcomers. In 2015, the Syriac Orthodox community got permission to build a Syriac Orthodox Church in this part of the city, for their 15,000 members in  Istanbul, where not only the large majority of Turkey's Assyrians live, but also the majority of Istanbul's Assyrians. On 3 August 2019, in the presence of the Patriarch of the Syriac Church, of Patriarch Bartholomew and of Istanbul Mayor Ekrem İmamoğlu, President Erdoğan laid in Yeşilköy the first stone of the first Syriac church erected in Turkey since the foundation of the republic. The area chosen for the construction is a part of the ground of the ancient Levantine cemetery.

Yeşilköy today

Yeşilköy – whose population is mainly affluent - retains some notable examples of wooden Art Nouveau houses built between the end of the nineteenth and the beginning of the twentieth centuries. It has a Marina - the Yeşilköy Burnu Marina -  and sandy beaches.

Istanbul Atatürk International Airport, formerly known as the Yeşilköy Airport, is located in this district. The headquarters of Turkish Airlines are on the property of the airport. MyCargo Airlines (formerly ACT Airlines) has its head office in Level 4, Building A3 of the Istanbul World Trade Center (İstanbul Dünya Ticaret Merkezi) in Yeşilköy. Borajet also has its head office in Yeşilköy. When Bestair existed, its head office was in Yeşilköy.

On the waterfront, a small museum dedicated to the village and its minorities has been opened in 2012.

Yeşilköy has a station for the Marmaray commuter railway between Gebze and Halkalı. The first station, servicing the suburban railway line (Banliyö Treni) to Sirkeci, was built in 1871, and contributed to the neighbourhood's boom as a popular resort.

Yeşilköy borders the neighbourhoods of Yeşilyurt to the northeast, and Florya to the southwest.

Honour
San Stefano Peak on Rugged Island in the South Shetland Islands, Antarctica is named after the settlement, in connection with the Treaty of San Stefano.

Images of Yeşilköy

Notes

Sources

External links

Neighbourhoods of Bakırköy
Fishing communities in Turkey